Eugene Lee Yang (born January 18, 1986) is an American filmmaker, actor, producer, author, director, activist and internet celebrity, best known for being a member of the YouTube group The Try Guys (2014–present) and his work with BuzzFeed (2013–2018). Yang is also known for his work with various human rights and LGBTQ+ advocacy charities such as The Trevor Project.

Early life and education 
Yang, the only son of South Korean immigrants Min-yeong Lee and Jae-hong Yang, was born and raised in Pflugerville, Texas. He has two sisters. Growing up in Pflugerville, Yang’s family was one of the few Asian Americans in their community. He struggled with body image issues and low self-esteem as, in his own words, no one looked like him, and suffered bullying due to his appearance.

Early on, he lost his Texan accent by the prodding of his sister, who told him he might face difficulties getting into Ivy League schools. Initially, he was skeptical going into films, explaining that his doubts on getting mainstream acceptance stemmed from the lack of representation of Asian American in films and for being queer:

At school, he engaged in artistic activities including visual arts, illustration, theater, choir, and dance. However, a seventh-grade teacher recommended that he should consider studying filmmaking. He later went to the University of Southern California and, during his studies, wrote and directed six short films discussing social and political topics, including mental health care, gay marriage, and school shootings. He graduated with a B.A. in cinema production in 2008.

Career

Early career 
After college, Yang did freelance work producing music videos, and writing and filming commercials for five years.

BuzzFeed 
In 2013, he started working for the video branch of the internet media company, BuzzFeed, at the recommendation of a colleague who saw his potential in creating short format videos. He was given free control on experimental video productions and exploring new modes of storytelling.

A few of his works were centered on stereotypes, body issues, and Asian American identity, producing If Disney Princes Were Real, which had earned over 70 million views, and Women's Ideal Body Types Throughout History, which was viewed over 40 million times and remained one of the Buzzfeed's most watched, on YouTube. According to Glamour, "Yang's videos work because they're funny-with-a-message riffs on all-American cultural touchstones—like high school vs. college, awkward private moments, and, pet ownership. But he's also not afraid to tackle issues surrounding race—especially when it comes to the Asian American community."

The Try Guys

Reaction to some of his early works was positive particularly on their distinct candor and reliability, which led to more provocative sketches such as The Try Guys, which was established in Buzzfeed in 2014, together with co-stars Ned Fulmer (former member of the Try guys), Keith Habersberger, and Zach Kornfeld. The show is a mix of social commentary and humor depicting scenarios such as men going through labor pains and prostate cancer check at a doctor's office. The cast initially were hesitant about stepping out from behind the camera as they had limited experience being talents, but they continued producing videos for the show after receiving positive feedback.

Yang became a recognized name on social media, taking on challenges, such as the first season's first episode, "Guys Try Ladies' Underwear For the First Time". The New York Times considered him as the breakout star of The Try Guys.

On June 16, 2018, he and the rest of the cast of The Try Guys announced that they had left BuzzFeed and established 2nd Try LLC, a company that they own and manage. The 2nd Try LLC gained all rights to The Try Guys brand. Yang was the first of The Try Guys to leave Buzzfeed, as his contract was up before the other Try Guys.

On May 4, 2019, The Try Guys announced that they were publishing a book called The Hidden Power of F*cking Up, which was published June 18, 2019, and became a New York Times Best Seller. In the same video, The Try Guys also announced their tour which took on a "'80s rock-band theme" and their podcast which is called the "Try-Pod".

In October 2020, the Try Guys endorsed Joe Biden's 2020 presidential campaign.

Television and film
In 2019, Yang made a guest appearance on NBC sitcom Brooklyn Nine-Nine, portraying Theo Lorql.

He is set to star in the animated film Nimona as Ambrosius Goldenloin, releasing on Netflix in 2023.

Novels
Yang has announced that his YA fiction writing debut will be a two-part queer fantasy epic called The Unders, with the first book scheduled to release in Spring 2024.

Themes

Asian American representation 
Yang advocates for equality, representation and diversity in his projects, tackling racial issues surrounding Asian American identity and the lack of interest in casting Asian American men as audiences are exposed to desexualized secondary roles or comedic sidekicks.

The Buzzfeed video parody, Awkward Moments Only Asians Understand, in which he starred, listed a slew of racial stereotypes and daily microaggressions. Marcie Bianco wrote in her critique, "The microaggressions detailed in this BuzzFeed video don't have to do with the size of the Asian population, but rather highlight how stereotypes are perpetuated by generalizations. Perhaps sometimes useful shorthand, these generalizations turn into ugly and limiting stereotypes that foreclose the possibility of people knowing each other as individuals."

In another related video, If Asians Said the Stuff White People Say, in which he starred in together with Los Angeles-based writer and comedian Jenny Yang, featured Asian Americans asking questions and comments to white characters that were considered uncomfortable for Asian Americans. In her review, Lauren Davidson wrote, "That's the first racist stereotype turned on its head in BuzzFeed Yellow's latest video, which shows, with that classic trick of role reversal, how ridiculous Asian typecasting has become."

On March 17, 2017, he produced Asian Men Re-Create Iconic Underwear Ads, which explored the theme of Asian men as sexually inferior. The video recreated iconic ads of underwear using average Asian male models.

LGBTQ 
Yang is the only openly gay member among the cast of The Try Guys, which also produced LGBTQ-themed videos such as season 1 episode 3 The Try Guys Try Drag for the First Time. On October 31, 2018, he published the video, My Dad's First Drag Show (Featuring Kim Chi), where he adopted a similar approach into exploring drag culture by inviting his father and stepmother to a drag show. Yang has adopted the drag queen persona named Cheyenne Pepper, and Mayhem Miller from season 10 of RuPaul's Drag Race is Pepper's drag mother.

He also executive produced and hosted Buzzfeed's Queer Prom five-part video series that documented the journey of eight high school seniors who attended the company's first LGBTQ-themed prom together with other students.

On October 11, 2018, commemorated as the 30th year of National Coming Out Day, he took over the website of the advocacy group Human Rights Campaign, publicly sharing his experience growing up as a young queer man and advocating for LGBTQ representation in the media. Furthermore, he collaborated with The Trevor Project, a non-profit LGBTQ suicide prevention organization, to raise awareness on the incidence of suicide among LGBTQ youth and in inviting volunteers in the video Eugene Volunteers at the Trevor Project, which was posted on December 3, 2018.

He previously referred to himself as "queer" and "LGBT". However, on June 15, 2019, Yang explicitly came out as gay in a music video. Two days later, Yang released an accompanying video documenting the creation of the video, his feelings, and his thoughts surrounding his coming out process.

Personal life 
On June 15, 2019, Yang came out as gay in a YouTube video that has donated over $150,000 to The Trevor Project. Since 2012, he has been in a relationship with Matthew McLean.

In July 2022, Yang hosted a fundraiser with Beto O'Rourke, a gubernatorial candidate in Texas.

Filmography

Film

Television

Awards 
Yang won several awards with his work with The Try Guys. Additionally, on Jun 20, 2016, he was awarded Unforgettable 2015 Male Breakout Star of the Year. In October 2019, he was awarded the Human Rights Campaign's Visibility Award. In May 2020, he was given the Phenom Award for LGBTQ+ Activism from the Shorty Awards for his work with The Trevor Project, for whom he has hosted multiple fundraising events and raised over $150,000 through his coming out video. Yang was one of the first honorees given the 2021 YouTube Channel Changer Award for his work for racial justice through his documentary and fundraiser, We Need To Talk About Anti-Asian Hate.

See also 
 List of The Try Guys episodes

References

External links 
 

1986 births
American male film actors
American male television actors
American male voice actors
American male web series actors
American male actors of Korean descent
American film directors of Korean descent
Web series producers
People from Pflugerville, Texas
BuzzFeed people
American gay actors
American LGBT people of Asian descent
21st-century American male actors
21st-century American comedians
Living people
LGBT YouTubers
YouTubers from Texas
LGBT people from Texas
Male actors from Texas
Male bloggers
Streamy Award winners
Video bloggers
Comedy YouTubers
Film directors from Texas
Shorty Award winners
20th-century American LGBT people
21st-century American LGBT people